Gonatopus may refer to:
 Gonatopus (wasp), a genus of wasps in the family Dryinidae
 Gonatopus (plant), a genus of plants in the family Araceae